Charles Mutton (14 September 1890 – 13 May 1989) was an Australian politician.

He was born in North Melbourne to tobacco worker Charles Mutton and Mary Ann Moloney. He attended Catholic schools and from 1903 to 1910 worked for Excelsior Barbed Wire and Nail Works. In 1911 he became an ironworker, and in August 1914 he married Annie Maria Peachey, with whom he had four children. In 1908 he had joined the Labor Party, and in 1917 he became founding president of the Fawkner branch. In 1930 he inherited his father's poultry farm, and also became president of the Iron Founders' Union. He was a Broadmeadows Shire councillor from 1925 to 1953, serving twice as president (1934–35, 1947–48). In 1940 he was elected to the Victorian Legislative Assembly in a by-election for the seat of Coburg; for running as an Independent Labor candidate, he was expelled from the Labor Party. In June 1956 he was re-admitted to the party, and he served until his retirement in 1967, when he was succeeded by his son Jack. Mutton died in Melbourne in 1989.

References

1890 births
1989 deaths
Independent members of the Parliament of Victoria
Australian Labor Party members of the Parliament of Victoria
Members of the Victorian Legislative Assembly
20th-century Australian politicians